Pradip is a given name of Indian origin. People with that name include:

Pradip Baijal, retired officer of the Indian Administrative Service
Pradip Bhattacharya (born 1945), Indian politician from West Bengal
Pradip Chatterjee, founder member of the Bengali band Moheener Ghoraguli
Pradip Krishen, Indian film director, naturalist, eco-botanist and environmentalist
Pradip Kumar Banerjee (born 1936), Indian football playe
Pradip Kumar Barma, Indian politician
Pradip Somasundaran (born 1967), playback singer and a lecturer in Electronics from Kerala, India